Deh-e Sangu (also Romanized as Deh-e Sangū) is a village in Qorqori Rural District, Qorqori District, Hirmand County, Sistan and Baluchestan Province, Iran. At the 2006 census, its population was 34, in 8 families.

References 

Populated places in Hirmand County